Hochfeld may refer to:

Hochfeld, Duisburg
Hochfeld, Manitoba, Canada
Hochfeld, Namibia
Hochfeld, the German name for Fofeldea village, Nocrich Commune, Sibiu County, Romania
Hochfeld, the German name for Bieździadów, Jarocin County, Greater Poland Voivodeship, in west-central Poland.